The Huawei P9 is a Chinese high-end Android smartphone produced by Huawei, released in 2016. It is the successor to the Huawei P8 and maintains almost the same design but has a dual camera setup in the back co-engineered with Leica along with a fingerprint sensor. The Huawei P9 has a 5.2-inch Full HD IPS-NEO LCD display and runs on Android 6.0 Marshmallow OS.

Release
The P9 was released in April 2016 in London and in August 2016 in India.

New features
The P9 added a fingerprint sensor, and was the first Huawei smartphone with a camera co-engineered with Leica under a partnership announced in February 2016. The camera system integrates images from dual rear camera sensors, one monochrome, the other three-colour, which makes possible greater contrast, better low-light images, and shallow depth of field effects, and also refocusing after image capture. Storing two versions of images increases memory use, so there is also a microSD slot to increase storage capacity.

Variants
The Huawei P9 Plus, released in May 2016, has 4 GB RAM, and storage of 64 GB.

The Huawei P9 Lite, released in May 2016 and also marketed as the Honor 8 Smart, has 2/3 GB RAM and storage of 16 GB.

Reception 

It was globally well received. Some regarded the P9 as a copy of the design of the iPhone 6, since it also uses pentalobe screws.

References

External links
 
 

Mobile phones introduced in 2016
Mobile phones with multiple rear cameras
Leica Camera
Discontinued flagship smartphones
Huawei smartphones